Halocosa is a genus of wolf spiders first described by G. N. Azarkina and L. A. Trilikauskas in 2019.  it contains only three species: H. cereipes, H. hatanensis, and H. jartica. The type species, Halocosa cereipes, was originally described under the name "Lycosa cereipes".

See also
 Evippa
 Pardosa
 Lycosa
 Pirata
 List of Lycosidae species

References

Further reading

Lycosidae genera